Acrocercops orthostacta is a moth of the family Gracillariidae, known from Bihar, India. It was described by Edward Meyrick in 1918. The hostplant for the species is Sida cordifolia.

References

orthostacta
Moths of Asia
Moths described in 1918